Pericles, named after the Athenian leader Pericles, was a 1,598 ton, iron hulled, three masted sailing ship, that was built by W. Hood & Co of Aberdeen, and launched in July 1877 to transport wool for the Aberdeen Line.

Trips to Australia 
Pericles was a fast ship and her maiden voyage from London to Melbourne took 71 days. She continued to be used on the passenger route to Australia, arriving in Sydney from London, via Plymouth on 5 December 1877 and 10 November 1878. On 31 July 1879 en route to Sydney she grounded on Pericles Point near the Helford River in thick fog. Pericles had a close call as Penere Point is near The Manacles, a reef which has claimed over one hundred ships. Two hours later, on a rising tide, she refloated and continued on her journey to Sydney. The following day her fore peak was found flooded and Captain Largie turned the ship around and returned to Plymouth for repairs.

Trip to Fiji 
She made a trip to Fiji carrying 461 Indian indentured labourers and arriving at Suva on 3 July 1884. There was an outbreak of cholera during the voyage, with thirty-five cases being reported and twenty deaths.

Sale and scrap 
In 1904, Pericles was sold to a Norwegian buyer and changed ownership twice more before being renamed Sjurso in 1916. She was scrapped at Kiel in September 1923.

See also 
 Indian indenture ships to Fiji
 Indians in Fiji
 Indian indenture system

References

External links
  illustrated description of Pericles and Brilliant

1877 ships
1871–1900 ships of Australia
Ships built in Aberdeen
History of Australia (1851–1900)
Indian indenture ships to Fiji
Individual sailing vessels
Victorian-era passenger ships of the United Kingdom
Maritime incidents in July 1879